Helicopter Sea Combat Squadron SIX (HSC-6), is a helicopter squadron of the United States Navy. It was established as Helicopter Antisubmarine Squadron SIX (HS-6) on 1 June 1956. Its nickname is Screamin’ Indians. On 8 July 2011 it was redesignated Helicopter Sea Combat Squadron SIX (HSC-6).  It is based at Naval Air Station North Island, is part of Carrier Air Wing 17 and deploys aboard the aircraft carrier .

History
Helicopter Anti-Submarine Squadron SIX (HS-6) was established on 1 June 1956 aboard  midway between the islands of Formosa and Okinawa.  Initially, the squadron flew the Sikorsky HO4S-3, but two years later transitioned to the Sikorsky HSS-1N Seabat greatly enhancing the ability of the squadron to conduct anti-submarine warfare (ASW).

In April 1960, the squadron joined Carrier Anti-Submarine Group 53 aboard . In March 1962 the squadron again changed aircraft when the Sikorsky HSS-2 Sea King entered the fleet. In September of that year the HSS-2 was redesignated the SH-3A Sea King with the Navy's adoption of the 1962 United States Tri-Service aircraft designation system. The Sea King, incorporating upgrades over the years, would take HS-6 into the 1990s. HS-6 recovered Mercury Program astronauts Wally Schirra in 1962 and Gordon Cooper in 1963. In 1966, during U.S. strikes into Vietnam, the Indians rescued 16 downed aviators, for which the squadron received the Navy Unit Commendation. By the end of the decade the squadron had transitioned to the SH-3D Sea King. In 1971, the Indians recovered the crew of Apollo 14 returning from the moon. Later that year, the squadron deployed to the east coast to join Carrier Air Wing 7 aboard  to conduct an evaluation of the emerging CV concept.

 
In 1975 the squadron transitioned aircraft again, this time to the SH-3H Sea King which it would fly for most of the next two decades. The successful HS-6, CVW-9, USS Constellation partnership resulted in Battle “E” Awards in 1974 and 1978 and back-to-back Captain Arnold Jay Isbell Trophies for ASW excellence in 1977 and 1978. The squadron also won the CNO Safety ‘S’ Award in 1977. In 1975, HS-6 briefly revisited its participation in the space program, recovering the Apollo–Soyuz astronauts. The squadron’s final deployment on board Constellation was highlighted by 19 open ocean rescues. HS-6 again won back-to-back Captain Arnold Jay Isbell Trophies in 1985 and 1986. Additionally, in 1986, the squadron received the Admiral Jimmy Thach Award for carrier-based ASW excellence and the CNO Safety ‘S’ Award. In 1988 the Indians received worldwide recognition for rescuing a seriously injured Japanese fisherman. That year, HS-6 would also receive the Sikorsky Maintenance Award, the CNO Safety ‘S’ Award, and the Joint Meritorious Unit Commendation. HS-6 later joined Carrier Air Wing ELEVEN (CVW-11) and began deploying on board  until 1989 when the Indians finished with an Around the World cruise. On that cruise, HS-6 won the first ever DESRON 21 “Order of the Pummeled Dolphin” award for excellence in ASW. In 1992, the squadron transitioned to the Sikorsky SH-60F Seahawk and HH-60H Seahawk helicopters.
 
In 2001, during the opening days of the Global War on Terrorism, HS-6 conducted a joint detachment with HS-11, staging their HH-60H helicopters at a forward base in Pakistan to provide Combat Search and Rescue for the initial Operation Enduring Freedom air strikes into Afghanistan. Following another 5th Fleet deployment in 2003, the Indians deployed in the summer of 2004 aboard  for its South American inter-fleet transit. That year, the Indians were awarded the CNO Safety ‘S’ Award, COMPACFLT Retention Excellence Award, and Arleigh Burke Fleet Trophy. The squadron’s support of Operation Iraqi Freedom and Operation Enduring Freedom during WESTPAC ’07, and their performance in the 7th Fleet throughout 2008 earned the Indians the 2007 Battle “E”, and back-to-back CNO Safety ‘S’ Awards in 2007 and 2008. In March 2010, the squadron completed its final cruise with SH-60F/HH-60H helicopters, an eight-month deployment to 5th Fleet in support of Operation Enduring Freedom.

HS-6 began the transition the Sikorsky MH-60S Seahawk in early 2011 and was redesignated Helicopter Sea Combat Squadron 6 (HSC-6) on 8 July 2011. As an HSC squadron the Indians no longer conduct Anti-Submarine Warfare, their primary rolls now are Anti-Surface Warfare (ASuW), Combat Search and Rescue (CSAR), Naval Special Operations Support, Search and Rescue (SAR) and Vertical Replenishment (VERTREP) in support of the carrier strike group. The squadron was again assigned to CVW-11 aboard USS Nimitz and participated in exercise RIMPAC 2012. This was followed by a deployment aboard Nimitz to the Western Pacific, the Indian Ocean and the Mediterranean Sea from March to December 2013.  In 2016 the squadron was assigned to Carrier Air Wing 17 (CVW-17) which deploys aboard .

See also

 History of the United States Navy
 List of United States Navy aircraft squadrons

References

HS-6 Indians Website
HS-6 veterans website

External links

Helicopter anti-submarine squadrons of the United States Navy